Mark Kratzmann and Wally Masur were the defending champions, but lost in first round to Sergio Casal and Emilio Sánchez.

David Adams and Andrei Olhovskiy won the title by defeating Grant Connell and Patrick Galbraith 6–7, 6–4, 7–6 in the final.

Seeds

Draw

Draw

References
 Official Results Archive (ATP)
 Official Results Archive (ITF)

Doubles